Tyushkovskaya is a rural locality (a village) in Kharovskoye Rural Settlement, Kharovsky District, Vologda Oblast, Russia. The population was 32 as of 2002.

Geography 
Tyushkovskaya is located 6 km northwest of Kharovsk (the district's administrative centre) by road. Sitinsky is the nearest rural locality.

References 

Rural localities in Kharovsky District